Glenn Burvill (born 26 October 1962) is an English former footballer who played as a midfielder for Aldershot, Fulham and Reading in the Football League.

Football career

Club career

Burvill started with West Ham United as an apprentice in their youth squad and was a member of the team which won the 1981 Youth Cup. Without making a first team appearance for West Ham before he moved to Aldershot in 1983. Burvill also played for Fulham and Reading.
After leaving Aldershot Burvill moved into non-league football with Newhaven, Peacehaven and Saltdean taking over as manager of Saltdean for the start of 1999/2000 which finished with them winning the John O'Hara Cup. Resigning in January 2001 after a poor run of results Burvill rejoined Newhaven and also appeared for Lewes in the Sussex Senior Cup semi-final.
He joined Whitehawk in the summer of 2001 as player-coach, before managing jointly with Ian Chapman for the rest of the season.

References

1962 births
Living people
West Ham United F.C. players
Aldershot F.C. players
Reading F.C. players
Fulham F.C. players
Newhaven F.C. players
Peacehaven & Telscombe F.C. players
Saltdean United F.C. players
Lewes F.C. players
Whitehawk F.C. players
English Football League players
Footballers from Canning Town
Saltdean United F.C. managers
Association football midfielders
English footballers
English football managers